Denis "Dinny" Ryan (1927 – 28 September 2009) was an Irish hurler who played for the Tipperary senior team.

Ryan joined the team during the 1949 championship and was a regular member of the extended panel for just two seasons. During that time he won one All-Ireland medal and one Munster medal as a non-playing substitute.

At club level Ryan was a multiple North Tipperary divisional medalist with Roscrea.

His brothers, Mick and Jack Ryan, also played with Tipperary.

References

1927 births
2009 deaths
Roscrea hurlers
Tipperary inter-county hurlers